Amphiorycteropus (Latin for "near aardvark") or the wooly aardvark is an extinct genus of mammals in the family Orycteropodidae within Tubulidentata. The genus is known from fossils dating from Middle Miocene to Early Pliocene, found in Africa, Asia and Europe.

Species 
Five species are recognized:
 Amphiorycteropus abundulafus   - Late Miocene of Chad
 Amphiorycteropus mauritanicus   - Late Miocene of Algeria
 Amphiorycteropus browni   - Middle to Late Miocene of Pakistan
 Amphiorycteropus depereti   - Early Pliocene of France
 Amphiorycteropus gaudryi   - Late Miocene of Greece and Turkey

Other two species are assigned to the genus provisionally until new material are found and confirm the relationship:
 Amphiorycteropus pottieri   - Late Miocene of Turkey
 Amphiorycteropus seni   - Middle Miocene of Turkey

References 

Orycteropodidae
Prehistoric Afrotheria
Prehistoric placental genera
Fossil taxa described in 2009